Eduard Viktorovich Sakhnevich (born 2 September 1980) is a former Russian footballer.

Career
Before joining Pahang, he played in his native Russia with FC Luch-Energiya Vladivostok (in the Russian Football National League) and FC Lukhovitsy, in Vietnam with Becamex Binh Duong F.C. and in Bangladesh with Sheikh Russel KC.

On 10 February 2012 Sakhnevich joined Malaysia Premier League outfit Pahang, which has another Russian in their books Boris Kochkin. He replaced Nana Yaw Agyei. However, his contract was terminated by Pahang on 10 April due to performance issues, although Sakhnevich had contributed four goals in his six appearances with the Elephants.

References

External links
 
 Eduard drives Sk Russel
 
 

1980 births
Sportspeople from Vladivostok
Living people
Russian footballers
Russian expatriate footballers
FC Luch Vladivostok players
Sri Pahang FC players
Expatriate footballers in Malaysia
Russian expatriate sportspeople in Malaysia
Association football forwards
FC Lukhovitsy players